Puggy Smalls is a Pug living in Kent, UK. Puggy Smalls is a pet influencer and best known for appearing out of numerous things such as office drawers, fruit and takeaway boxes.

History 
Puggy Smalls, named after The Notorious B.I.G. or Biggie Smalls the late rapper, owned by Nick Ettridge from when Puggy was only eight weeks old. Ettridge began to dress Puggy like a human when he saw how it gives people and Puggy happiness. During Puggy's career, he has worked with brands such as Cadbury and 9GAG. In 2018, Puggy Smalls helped a superfan get engaged by wearing an engagement ring box on his back surprising the couple in a London park. He is also known for swimming in air and just being super cute.

In summer 2019 the video of Puggy Smalls emerging out of a watermelon while licking the contents of said watermelon had a viral viewing tally of 35 million worldwide. Resulting in many celebrity fans and a live TV appearance on Australia's The Morning Show. In the same year, Puggy was hired by Canine Cottages to review holiday properties around the UK.

Media 
Puggy has an Instagram following of over 170K, Facebook following of 200k, and over 100 million views from his own page, and over a billion views network-wide, and has been featured on television channels such as Australia's Channel 7, also appeared on Right This Minute TV program, The Telegraph and Take a break Pets magazine as a featured dog.

References 

Individual dogs